Anne "Nanna" Bolton Matthews Bryant (1871 – 1933) was an American artist.

Career 
Bryant was a member of a Boston Brahmin family, the daughter of William C. Fay and Annie Fay Matthews. She lived at 9 Exeter Street in Boston's Back Bay, traveling frequently to Europe. She studied at the Académie Julian in Paris. There she focused on painting and met Wallace Bryant, whom she would marry in 1898. The two separated around 1917. Nanna began studying sculpting under Frederick Warren Allen at that point.

Bryant was awarded the Sterling Memorial Sculpture prize in 1931.

References

1871 births
1933 deaths
American artists
Sculptors from Massachusetts